Jeffrey or Jeff Fuller may refer to:

People
Jeff Fuller (racing driver) (born 1957), NASCAR driver
Jeff Fuller (safety) (born 1962), former American football safety for the San Francisco 49ers, 1984–1989
Jeff Fuller (wide receiver) (born 1990), his son, American football wide receiver
Jeffrey Fuller, ACLU Membership Director, 1948–1959
Jeff Fuller, bass player in the Lou Donaldson quartet

Other
Jeffrey Fuller series, a novel series written by Joe Buff

Fuller, Jeff